Giuseppe Pamphilj may refer to:
Giuseppe Doria Pamphili (1751–1816), Catholic cardinal
Giuseppe Pamphilj (bishop of Kotor) (1580–1622), Catholic bishop
Giuseppe Pamphilj (bishop of Segni) (1525–1581), Catholic bishop